John Sullivan (7 February 1920 – 22 February 2008) was an Irish-born wrestler who competed for Great Britain. He competed in the men's freestyle light heavyweight at the 1948 Summer Olympics.

References

External links
 

1920 births
2008 deaths
British male sport wrestlers
Olympic wrestlers of Great Britain
Wrestlers at the 1948 Summer Olympics